The following are the national records in track cycling in South Africa maintained by South Africa's national cycling federation: Cycling South Africa.

Men
Key to tables:

Women

References
General
 South African records 31 July 2022
Specific

External links
 Cycling South Africa web site

South Africa
Records
Track cycling
track cycling